Omidiyeh (also Romanized as Omīdīyeh) is a city and capital of Omidiyeh County, Khuzestan Province, Iran.  At the 2006 census, its population was 57,970, in 12,123 families.

Climate

Omidiyeh has a desert climate (Köppen climate classification BWh) with long, very hot summers and mild, short winters. Omidiyeh is consistently one of the hottest places on the planet during the summer, with summer temperatures regularly at least 45 degrees Celsius, sometimes exceeding 50 degrees Celsius with many sandstorms and dust storms common during the summer period. However, in winters, the minimum temperature can fall to around +5 degrees Celsius. The average annual rainfall is around 255 mm.

References

External links
 Omidiyeh Photo Gallery from the Khuzestan Governorship
 Omidieh website

Populated places in Omidiyeh County
Cities in Khuzestan Province